Kakusuu  is a village in Võru Parish, Põlva County in southeastern Estonia.

References

 

Villages in Võru County